Richlands is a town in Onslow County, North Carolina, United States. The 2010 population was 1,520. It is included in the Jacksonville, North Carolina Metropolitan Statistical Area.  Incorporated on March 29, 1880, it was the first town in Onslow County to have its own library and museum (home of the Onslow County Museum). Richlands was also the first town in Onslow County to have a female mayor, Annette Hargett.

History
A post office called Richlands has been in operation since 1806. The town was so named on account of its rich soil.

The Avirett-Stephens Plantation, Richlands Historic District, Taylor Farm, and Venters Farm Historic District are listed on the National Register of Historic Places.

Geography

Notable Businesses
Guy C. Wiggins Hardware has been around for over 90 years. The store is located at 103 W Hargett Street.

Demographics

2020 census

As of the 2020 United States census, there were 2,287 people, 772 households, and 525 families residing in the town.

2000 census
As of the census of 2000, there were 928 people, 399 households, and 244 families residing in the town. The population density was 781.1 people per square mile (301.1/km). There were 424 housing units at an average density of 356.9 per square mile (137.6/km). The racial makeup of the town was 71.44% White, 25.11% African American, 0.43% Native American, 0.75% Asian, 0.75% from other races, and 1.51% from two or more races. Hispanic or Latino of any race were 2.16% of the population.

There were 399 households, out of which 27.8% had children under the age of 18 living with them, 40.4% were married couples living together, 16.8% had a female householder with no husband present, and 38.6% were non-families. 35.1% of all households were made up of individuals, and 20.6% had someone living alone who was 65 years of age or older. The average household size was 2.33 and the average family size was 3.03.

In the town, the population was spread out, with 23.3% under the age of 18, 8.1% from 18 to 24, 26.0% from 25 to 44, 23.9% from 45 to 64, and 18.8% who were 65 years of age or older. The median age was 41 years. For every 100 females, there were 78.1 males. For every 100 females age 18 and over, there were 73.2 males.

The median income for a household in the town was $20,263, and the median income for a family was $31,667. Males had a median income of $26,875 versus $20,000 for females. The per capita income for the town was $18,615. About 23.1% of families and 24.5% of the population were below the poverty line, including 30.8% of those under age 18 and 24.0% of those age 65 or over.

Schools
 Heritage Elementary School
 Richlands Elementary School
 Trexler Middle School
 Richlands High School
 Liberty Christian Academy

Farmer's Day
Farmer's Day was an annual celebration of Richland's agrarian roots. Traditionally held on the first Saturday after Labor Day each year, the festival began in 1966 and ran for 50 years before ending in 2016. The celebration began in the morning with a parade through town and continued on the grounds of Richlands Primary School (now Heritage Elementary School). The day includes live music, local vendors, games, and food.

Notable people
 Jeremy Hall – Army soldier, filed lawsuit against the DoD for religious discrimination
Tyler Matthews, NASCAR driver
 Charlie Sanders – Pro Football Hall of Fame Inductee; 1970s NFL All-Decade Team
 John Williams Shackelford – 19th-century U.S. Congressman
 Mario Williams – Number one overall pick in the 2006 NFL draft, DE Buffalo Bills

References

Towns in Onslow County, North Carolina
Towns in North Carolina